This is a list of museums in Malawi.

List
 Chamare Museum & Research Centre
 Chichiri Museum
 Cultural & Museum Centre Karonga
 Lake Malawi Museum
 Kungoni
 Mtengatenga Postal Hut Museum
 Mtengatenga Museum
 Mzuzu Regional Museum
 Mandala House
 Stone House
 Transport Museum (Limbe)
 William Murray Museum

See also
 List of museums

References

External links
 Museums in Malawi from AFRICOM

Malawi
Malawi education-related lists
Lists of buildings and structures in Malawi
Museums
Malawi